Unrest is a social disturbance.

Unrest may also refer to:

Music
 Unrest (band), an American indie rock band
 Unrest (Erlend Øye album), 2003
 Unrest (Henry Cow album), 1974
 Unrest (Unrest album), 1985
 "Unrest", a song by Parkway Drive from Deep Blue, 2010

Other uses
 Unrest (2006 film), an American horror film
 Unrest (2017 film), an American documentary
 Unrest (video game), a 2014 role-playing game